For the medievalist and fantasy author J. R. R. Tolkien, Northern courage was exemplified by the way the gods of Norse mythology knew they would die in the last battle, but they went to fight anyway. He was influenced, too, by the Old English poems Beowulf and The Battle of Maldon, which both praise heroic courage. Northern courage features in Tolkien's world of Middle-earth as a central virtue, closely connected to luck and fate. The protagonists of The Hobbit and The Lord of the Rings are advised by the Wizard, Gandalf, to keep up their spirits, as fate is always uncertain. Tolkien had mixed feelings about heroic courage, as seen in his 1953 The Homecoming of Beorhtnoth Beorhthelm's Son, where he bitterly criticises the English leader Byrhtnoth for giving ground to the enemy: the disastrous mistake led to defeat and Byrhtnoth's death.

Context 

J. R. R. Tolkien was a scholar of English literature, a philologist and medievalist interested in language and poetry from the Middle Ages, especially that of Anglo-Saxon England and Northern Europe. His professional knowledge of Beowulf, telling of a pagan world but with a Christian narrator, helped to shape his fictional world of Middle-earth. His intention to create what has been called "a mythology for England" led him to construct not only stories but a fully-formed world, Middle-earth, with languages, peoples, cultures, and history. Among his many influences were medieval languages and literature. He is best known as the author of the high fantasy works The Hobbit and The Lord of the Rings, both set in Middle-earth.

Incorporating the medieval North

A hybrid mythology for England 

The medievalist Marjorie Burns writes that "J.R.R. Tolkien's Middle-earth is conspicuously and intricately northern in both ancient and modern ways." She cites a letter to the classics scholar Rhona Beare, where Tolkien wrote that he had not invented the name "Middle-earth", as it had come from "inhabitants of Northwestern Europe, Scandinavia, and England". She states that Tolkien certainly "saw England as rightfully part of this North". She cites his statement in "Beowulf: The Monsters and the Critics" that Beowulf, which she describes as "northern to the hilt", was written in England and "moves in our northern world beneath our northern sky." That does not mean that Norse mythology is the sole source of Tolkien's fantasy; Burns writes that there is "another northernness in his Middle-earth literature, a Celtic northernness." Douglass Parker wrote that Tolkien "has made his world a reflection, or 'pre-reflection' of England before the triumph of Christianity, of the action and reaction between Celt and Teuton... he has ransacked the available mythologies." Middle-earth has been described by scholars including Jane Chance and Tom Shippey as "a mythology for England". In reply to the journalists Charlotte and Denis Plimmer of The Daily Telegraph, who had proposed in a draft article that "Middle-earth .... corresponds spiritually to Nordic Europe", Tolkien wrote 

 

Tolkien goes on to deny the poet W. H. Auden's assertion that for him "the North is a sacred direction", saying that instead "The North-west of Europe ... has my affection, but it is not 'sacred', nor does it exhaust my affections.".

Northern courage "even in our own times"  

The gods know they will die in the battle, but they go and fight anyway. Tolkien wrote in his 1936 lecture "The Monsters and the Critics" that he was inspired by that final but doomed battle. He stated directly that in his view Northern courage was the most important literary idea from the medieval North: 

Tolkien was writing about the poetic quality and meaning of Beowulf, an Old English poem, suggesting a close connection of English and Scandinavian mythology: 

Tolkien states that whereas "the older southern imagination" (Greek and Roman mythology) has become mere "literary ornament", the Northern vision of courage "has power, as it were, to revive its spirit even in our own times." The Tolkien scholar Tom Shippey comments that Tolkien saw the danger in this, as it could be used for good or ill, and not long after the lecture, the Nazis revived the myth.

Among Men and Hobbits 

The medievalist Marjorie Burns writes that the theme of courageous action in the face of inevitable loss in The Lord of the Rings is borrowed from the Old Norse world view which emphasises "imminent or threatening destruction". Even the home-loving Hobbits Frodo and Sam share this courage, knowing they have little prospect of returning home from their desperate quest to Mount Doom. Similarly, Janet Brennan Croft writes that the Hobbit Pippin may feel his part in the war to be "far from glorious" but he, like his friend Merry, is courageous, carrying on without hope.

The Tolkien scholar Tom Shippey states that Tolkien announces the arrival of the Riders of Rohan at the Battle of the Pelennor Fields with the phrase "Great horns of the North wildly blowing", meaning bravado and recklessness", and exemplifying the "heroic Northern world". The scholar of film Gwendolyn Morgan comments that Peter Jackson's films "successfully preserve the theory of Northern courage." She writes that this is "most obvious" in the culture of the Riders of Rohan, both in Tolkien's book and Jackson's films, as the heroes echo Ragnarök in their "courage to face horror and determination to do what is right that lies at the heart of Northern courage". Morgan sees this "most completely" in Jackson's two major battles, Helm's Deep and the Pelennor, citing the words of Rohan's King Théoden as he rides out to fight at Helm's Deep, expecting death:

Morgan further quotes Théoden's words before the Pelennor, stating that the battle "again exhibits the Rohirrim's Northern courage:

At the battle, Théoden orders his men to charge the enemy. Jackson gives him the words:

and the Riders respond, shouting "Death!" as they charge.

The medievalist Elizabeth Solopova contrasts the steady Northern courage of the hero and future king Aragorn with the old Steward of Gondor, Denethor, who completely lacks this quality. Shippey observes that Denethor's other opposite, King Théoden of Rohan, lives by Northern courage, and dies through Denethor's despair.

Among Elves: Fëanor versus Galadriel 

Richard Gallant, in the Journal of Tolkien Research, discusses how Northern courage is expressed by the Elves of the First Age of Middle-earth. He contrasts the actions of Fëanor and Galadriel, which he sees as exemplifying the "vices and virtues [respectively] of the Germanic ethos", the heroic framework in which both their families (Fëanorians and Fingolfins) operate. Fëanor unwisely chooses to rebel against the Valar, and fate accordingly follows him and his sons as they swear to do anything to regain the Silmarils. Gallant sees Galadriel as a rebel like Fëanor, but unlike him is able to turn "the fatalistic and heroic Elvish narrative to eucatastrophe through [her own] free will". Specifically, she refuses to take the One Ring when Frodo offers it. In Gallant's view, Galadriel is living out the Fingolfins' ethos as stated by Finrod Felagund to Andreth of the Edain: "To overthrow the Shadow, or if that may not be, to keep it from spreading once more over all Middle-earth – to defend the Children of Eru, Andreth, all the Children and not the proud Eldar only!" Gallant characterises this "ideology" as the Elves' heroic acceptance of "the long defeat". This is the process of decline and fall that Tolkien built into his legendarium, its only optimistic note being "the possibility of heroism". Both the Fëanorians' and the Fingolfins' ideologies fit within the "Northern courage framework", Gallant states, the one choosing its possessiveness, the other its endurance. He notes that Christina Scull and Wayne G. Hammond define Northern courage as the "ethic of endurance and resistance" of the Northern warrior.

Courage, luck, and fate  

Tolkien made multiple uses of the Old English poem Beowulf in his Middle-earth writings; its Northern courage appears as a central virtue in The Lord of the Rings. One example is Beorn in The Hobbit; he exudes heroic courage, being ferocious, rude, and cheerful, characteristics that reflect his huge inner self-confidence. The theory of courage is closely related to the Old English view of luck and fate that Tolkien adopted for Middle-earth. Beowulf defines its view of this in a proverb (lines 572b–573):

  
 "Fate often spares the man who isn't doomed, as long as his courage holds." 

Shippey remarks that this might seem to make no sense – how can fate spare a doomed man, and "aren't fate and doom much the same thing?" He answers his own question by stating that the Beowulf proverb is "an excellent guide for future conduct. Keep your spirits up, as no one can be sure what is fated". He notes further that in The Lord of the Rings the Wizard Gandalf repeatedly gives just this advice. In The Two Towers, Tolkien has the Dwarf Gimli say a version of the Old English proverb to the young Hobbits Merry and Pippin, on meeting up with them after a series of dangerous adventures at the ruined walls of Isengard: 

 "Luck served you there, but you seized your chance with both hands, one might say."

Burns states that Tolkien admired a certain Englishness, "the courage and tenacity ... in his fellow countrymen during the First World War ... to recognize duty and carry resolutely through." She adds that "It is the same with the hobbits, who return and rebuild the Shire. Though it is their complacent and comfort-seeking qualities that stand out most consistently, a warrior's courage or an Elf's sensitivity can arise in hobbits as well."

Courage, not pride 

Writing in Tolkien Studies, Mary R. Bowman notes "the indomitability that Tolkien saw as the defining quality of Northern courage". She comments that Gandalf's courageous blocking of the monstrous Balrog on the Bridge of Khazad-Dûm was a "pointed response" to the Old English poem The Battle of Maldon, where the English leader Byrhtnoth wrongly and disastrously gives way to the invaders, allowing them to land from their ships and form up for battle. She writes that in the 1936 talk The Monsters and the Critics, Tolkien praises the Northern courage that the poem describes, admiring its "'indomitability', the ability to persevere with the knowledge that sooner or later defeat will come." She notes that around the same time, in The Hobbit, Tolkien has Bilbo Baggins voice "a more critical view of the brand of heroism articulated in Maldon". Watching the Battle of Five Armies, he accepts he may be in "a last desperate stand", and thinks "I have heard songs of many battles, and I have always understood that defeat may be glorious. It seems very uncomfortable, not to say distressing. I wish I was well out of it." 

Thomas Honegger argues that in his 1953 alliterative verse play The Homecoming of Beorhtnoth Beorhthelm's Son, Tolkien bitterly criticises Byrhtnoth's overconfident pride, casting it in a wholly negative light. George Clark writes that Tolkien's reworking of the Old English poem specifically "chastises" Beorhtnoth for his pride, as well as criticising the Anglo-Saxon heroic ideals of the pursuit of fame and wealth. Shippey calls Tolkien's condemnation of Byrhtnoth "an act of parricide" against his Old English literary forebears, in which he "sacrifice[d]" what he had earlier described as "the northern heroic spirit". Amber Dunai notes Shippey's criticism of Tolkien's linking of Northern courage and "chivalry" as anachronistic, since in Shippey's words "[chivalry is] an attitude for which there is no evidence in England for perhaps another 150 years [after The Battle of Maldon]." She states that Northern courage "after all, is recognizable as such because exploits like Beorhtnoth’s were consistently represented in early medieval poetry as courageous and appealing."  Bowman comments that Tolkien struggles with the poem's heroism, but in his essay after the poem "hints at the possibility of rehabilitating that spirit". 

Lynn Forest-Hill, in Tolkien Studies, writes that Tolkien's response to Maldon "asserts unequivocally the connection between arrogance in military strategy and its horrifying aftermath". She compares Tolkien's attitude to Byrhtnoth's ofermod, "overmastering pride", with the flawed character Boromir. Where Byrhtnoth is simply guilty of "flawed leadership", Boromir is dangerously proud and overconfident, but ultimately redeems himself by "repent[ing] his evil act" and fighting to the death to save the young Hobbits.

Both Northern and Christian 

The arrival of the riders of Rohan at the Battle of the Pelennor Fields is heralded, Shippey writes, by two calls: a cockerel crowing as the morning comes, and "as if in answer ... great horns of the North wildly blowing". The cock-crow recalls multiple accounts in Western literature that speak, Shippey writes, of renewed hope and life after death; of the call which told Simon Peter that he had denied Christ three times, and that there would, despite him, be a resurrection; of the cock-crow in Milton's Comus that would "be some solace yet"; of the cockerel in the Norse Ódáinsakr, killed and thrown over a wall by the witch, but crowing to King Hadding a moment later. As for the horns of Rohan, in Shippey's view "their meaning is bravado and recklessness", and in combination with the cock-crow, the message is that "he who fears for his life shall lose it, but that dying undaunted is no defeat; furthermore that this was true before the Christian myth that came to explain why". In The Monsters and the Critics, Tolkien quoted W. P. Ker's The Dark Ages:

Shippey adds that warhorns exemplify the "heroic Northern world", echoing the moment in Beowulf when Ongentheow's Geats, trapped all night, hear the horns of Hygelac's men coming to rescue them.

Notes

References

Primary

Secondary

Sources 

 
 
 
  
  
 
 
 
 
 
 
 
 
 
    
 
 
 
  
  
    
     
   
     
     
 

Themes of The Lord of the Rings